Linh Dinh (Vietnamese: , born 1963, Saigon, Vietnam) is a Vietnamese-American poet, fiction writer, translator, and photographer.
 
He was a 1993 Pew Fellow. He writes a column for The Unz Review.

Biography
Dinh came to the US in 1975, lived in Philadelphia and in 2018 is moving back to Vietnam.

In 2005, he was a David Wong fellow at the University of East Anglia, in Norwich, England. 
He spent 2002–2003 in Italy as a guest of the International Parliament of Writers and the town of Certaldo.

He was a visiting faculty member at University of Pennsylvania. 
From 2015–2016, Dinh was the Picador Guest Professor for Literature at the University of Leipzig's Institute for American Studies in Leipzig, Germany.

Career
He is the author of two collections of stories, Fake House and Blood and Soap, and five books of poems: All Around What Empties Out, American Tatts, Borderless Bodies, Jam Alerts, and Some Kind of Cheese Orgy. His first novel, Love Like Hate, was published in October 2010 and won the Balcones Fiction Prize.

His work has been anthologized in Best American Poetry 2000, Best American Poetry 2004, The Best American Poetry 2007, and Great American Prose Poems from Poe to the Present. The Village Voice picked his Blood and Soap as one of the best books of 2004. Translated into Italian by Giovanni Giri, it is published in Italy as Elvis Phong è Morto.

Reviews
Publishers Weekly reviews Linh Dinh's American Tatts:

He has translated many international poets into Vietnamese, and many Vietnamese poets and fiction writers into English, including Nguyen Quoc Chanh, Tran Vang Sao, Van Cam Hai, and Nguyen Huy Thiep.

Works

Poetry 
Some Kind of Cheese Orgy, Chax Press, 2009, 
Jam Alerts, Chax Press, 2007, 
Lĩnh Đinh Chích Khoái, (Nhà xuất bản Giấy Vụn, Sài Gòn, 11.2007)
Borderless Bodies, poetry (Factory School, 2006)
American Tatts, poetry Chax Press, 2005, 
All Around What Empties Out, Subpress, 2003, 
Drunkard Boxing, Singing Horse Press, 1998,

Fiction
 Translated into Japanese (Hayakawa Publishing, 2008) and Italian (Spartaco, 2006), as Elvis Phong è Morto!.

Love Like Hate, Seven Stories Press, 2010,

Translations
Night, Fish and Charlie Parker, a bilingual edition of Phan Nhiên Hạo's poetry (Tupelo, 2006)

Editor
Contemporary Fiction from Vietnam (Seven Stories Press 1996)
Three Vietnamese Poets, translations (Tinfish, 2001)
Night, Again: Contemporary Fiction from Vietnam, anthology, Seven Stories, 1996,

Anthologies

References

External links
 AsianAmericanPoetry.Com Poet Profile On Linh Dinh
"Linh Dinh", PennSound
"Most Beautiful Words: Linh Dinh’s Poetics of Disgust", Jacket 27, Susan M. Schultz
"The Personal Becomes Political: The  Intensity of Linh Dinh", Marianne Villanueva, Pacific Rim Review of Books
"Linh Dinh with Matthew Sharpe", The Brooklyn Rail, May 2004

 Casino Time essay by Dinh on the economic and social distinctions that are circumvented (or not) by the terms "recession" and "depression"
Postcards from the End of America This is Dinh's own photo blog that was formerly called "State of the Union", but now renamed. Through a combination of essays (both photographic and words), Dinh has been  "tracking our deteriorating socialscape".

20th-century American poets
American male poets
American writers of Vietnamese descent
Academics of the University of East Anglia
Pew Fellows in the Arts
Vietnamese emigrants to the United States
People from Ho Chi Minh City
1963 births
Living people
20th-century American male writers